Eremothera is the scientific name of two genera of organisms and may refer to:

Eremothera (arachnid), a genus of wind scorpions in the family Eremobatidae
Eremothera (plant), a genus of plants in the family Onagraceae